"Rusty Bells" is a song written by Eddie Snyder and Richard Ahlert and performed by Brenda Lee.  The song reached #3 on the adult contemporary chart and #33 on the Billboard Hot 100 in 1965.  It was featured on her 1966 album, Bye Bye Blues.

The song was arranged by Bill McElhiney and Cam Mullins.

Other versions
Milva released a version of the song entitled "Una Campana" in 1966 as the B-side to "Occhi Spagnoli".
Mireille Mathieu released a French version of the song entitled "Qu'elle est Belle" in 1966.

References

1965 songs
1965 singles
Songs written by Eddie Snyder
Brenda Lee songs
Decca Records singles